Hans Joachim "John" Schellnhuber (born 7 June 1950) is a German atmospheric physicist, climatologist and founding director of the Potsdam Institute for Climate Impact Research (PIK) and former chair of the German Advisory Council on Global Change (WBGU).

Education
Schellnhuber studied mathematics and physics, obtaining a doctorate in theoretical physics from the University of Regensburg in 1980, followed in 1985 by habilitation (qualification for office) in theoretical physics at the University of Oldenburg. In 1981, he became a postdoctoral fellow at the Institute of Theoretical Physics (ITP) at the University of California, Santa Barbara, working across the corridor from its director Walter Kohn, who became one of his academic supervisors.

Career

Originally interested in solid state physics and quantum mechanics, Schellnhuber became drawn to complex systems and nonlinearity or chaos theory. 
As a full professor for theoretical physics and then director at the Institute for Chemistry and Biology of the Marine Environment at Oldenburg University, he was involved in analysing the structure of ocean currents.

In 1991, he was called upon to create the Potsdam Institute for Climate Impact Research (PIK), and became its director in 1993 – making it grow from zero to one of the world's most renowned climate research institutes with today more than 300 employees following an interdisciplinary approach.

As early as 1995 Schellnhuber proposed the 2 °C guardrail for global warming which was adopted first by the German government and the European Union and then, following the Copenhagen accord in 2009, as a global target by governments worldwide.

From 2001–2005 Schellnhuber served as research director of the Tyndall Centre in England and became a visiting professor at the University of Oxford.

Schellnhuber has been professor at the University of Potsdam, Germany, and an external professor at the Santa Fe Institute in the US.

As a long-standing member of the Intergovernmental Panel on Climate Change which was jointly awarded the 2007 Nobel Peace Prize, Schellnhuber has been a coordinating lead author of the synthesis chapter of Working Group II of the IPCC's Third Assessment Report. He has warned of dire consequences of continued global warming As an expert on climatological tipping points, he is a public speaker on the subject.

In 2017, Schellnhuber said that unless climate action is taken by 2020, the world "may be fatally wounded."

Achievements
Schellnhuber has helped create numerous iconic concepts such as the analysis of tipping elements in the climate system, the burning embers, and the budget approach for emissions.

Honors
In 2002, Schellnhuber received the Royal Society's Wolfson Research Merit Award  
In 2004 Her Majesty Queen Elizabeth II appointed him to Commander of the Order of the British Empire (CBE).  
In 2005, the National Academy of Sciences (US) appointed him as a member. He was awarded the German Environment Prize in 2007. 
In that same year, he was elected a member of the German Academy of Sciences Leopoldina.

In 2011, he was the first German to receive the Volvo Environment Prize, which is the highest-ranking award in the field of environmental sciences worldwide. He was honoured with the Order of Merit of the Federal Republic of Germany (first class) as well and holds honorary doctorates from Copenhagen University and Technical University of Berlin.

The German magazine Cicero in 2012 ranked him amongst the 500 most important German intellectuals. In 2017, Schellnhuber was awarded the Blue Planet Prize of the Asahi Glass Foundation.

Civic involvement and service
As one of the leading climate scientists worldwide, he has been a consultant to the former President of the European Union Commission, José Manuel Barroso. In 2007, he was appointed Chief Government Advisor on Climate and Related Issues during Germany's EU Council Presidency and G8 Presidency.

In 2007, Schellnhuber started "A Nobel Cause – Nobel Laureate Symposium Series on Global Sustainability" in Potsdam, bringing together Nobel Laureates from all disciplines with leading sustainability scientists. In 2009, this event took place in London and in 2011 in Stockholm, where the UN general secretary's High Level Panel on Sustainability came to the meeting to receive a memorandum that was fed into the Rio+20 conference in 2012.

Schellnhuber offers scientific insights to business leaders, as a member of the Climate Change Advisory Board of Deutsche Bank and chair of the governing board of the European Institute of Innovation and Technology's Climate Knowledge and Innovation Communities (EIT Climate KIC).
In 2012, he was the lead-author of a report commissioned by the World Bank on possible impacts of a 4 degrees Celsius warming towards the end of the 21st century. This report received a lot of attention worldwide. That same year, Schellnhuber presented the keynote at the gala dinner that opened the high-level segment of the world climate summit COP18 in Doha, Qatar. In the presence of UN Secretary-General Ban Ki Moon and UNFCCC's boss Christiana Figueres, a few days later Schellnhuber signed an agreement with the Qatar Foundation to jointly create a Climate change research institute in Qatar – a remarkable step as the country's wealth for decades had been based on exporting fossil fuels.

In 2013, Schellnhuber was one of 18 prominent international scientists to launch the Earth League, a global interdisciplinary alliance of leading research institutes that focus on Earth system analysis and sustainability science, including economy. UN Security Council members Pakistan and UK asked him to speak at a meeting of the Council under the Arria Formula, the meeting at the UN headquarter in New York was attended by UN Secretary General Ban Ki Moon. In the runup of the world climate summit in Warsaw, Schellnhuber discussed possible ways forward with the president of Cop19, the Polish Minister of the Environment Marcin Korolec. To advance the state of science, Schellnhuber initiated the Inter-Sectoral Impact Model Intercomparison Project (ISI-MIP) that involves more than 30 research teams from 12 countries. In 2013, the scientific journal Nature called it the "first comprehensive global-impact project" – it aims at identifying robust insights as well as research gaps, based on a yet unprecedentedly broad comparison of computer simulations of future climate change impacts such as water scarcity, floodings, or yield changes. In 2013, Schellnhuber's efforts resulted in the Impacts World Conference in Potsdam followed by a special feature on first ISI-MIP results in the Proceedings of the National Academy of Sciences (PNAS).

Schellnhuber has been serving as chair of the Climate-KIC (Knowledge and Innovation Community) governing board, which is affiliated to the European Institute of Innovation and Technology (EIT). This institution aims at fostering low-carbon entrepreneurship and innovation.

Schellnhuber signed the 2005 Potsdam Denkschrift calling for a change in thinking to enable sustainable development.

Personal life
He is married to Margret Boysen.

Publications

Schellnhuber has published more than 250 scientific papers and has authored, co-authored, or edited 50 books or book chapters.

 
 Schellnhuber, H. J., Crutzen, P.J., Clark, W.C., Claussen, M. and Held, H. (Eds.) (2004). Earth System Analysis for Sustainability. MIT Press, Cambridge, MA, London, UK
 Schellnhuber, H. J. and Wenzel V. (1998). Earth System Analysis: Integrating Science for Sustainability. Springer Verlag, Berlin.
 Schellnhuber, H. J. et al. (Eds.) (2006). Avoiding Dangerous Climate Change. Cambridge University Press, Cambridge, UK 
 
 Schellnhuber, H. J. et al. (2009). Solving the climate dilemma: The budget approach. WBGU Special Report, WBGU, Berlin
 
 
 
 
 Schellnhuber, H. J, Molina, M., Stern, N., Huber, V. and Kadner, S. (Eds.) (2010). Global Sustainability – A Nobel Cause. Cambridge University Press, Cambridge
 
 
 
 Kropp, J. P. and Schellnhuber, H. J. (Eds.) (2011). In Extremis: Disruptive Events and Trends in Climate and Hydrology. Springer Verlag, Berlin
 Richardson, K., Steffen, W., Liverman, D., et al. (including Schellnhuber, H. J.) (2011). Climate Change: Global Risks, Challenges and Decisions. Cambridge University Press, Cambridge
 
 
 Schellnhuber, H. J. et al. (2011). World in Transition – A Social Contract for Sustainability. WBGU Report, WBGU, Berlin 
 
 
 
 Kundzewicz, Z. W. et al. (including Schellnhuber, H. J.) (2012). Changes in Flood Risks – Setting the Stage. In Kundzewicz, Z. W. (Ed.) (2012). Changes in Flood Risks in Europe. IAHS Press, Oxfordshire, UK, 11
 Schellnhuber, H.J., Hare, W., Serdeczny, O. et al. (2012). Turn Down the Heat – Why a 4 °C Warmer World Must be Avoided. A Report commissioned by The World Bank

See also
 Developmental economics
 Ecological economics
 Sustainable development

References

External links

 
 Roll back time to safeguard climate, expert warns 15 September 2008
 Big Picture TV. Videos of John Schellnhuber talking about climate change. 11 December 2006.
 Terra quasi-incognita: beyond the 2°C line.  Download video, audio, slides International Climate Conference in Oxford, UK from 28–30 September 2009

1950 births
Living people
German climatologists
21st-century German physicists
German atheists
University of Regensburg alumni
Intergovernmental Panel on Climate Change lead authors
Sustainability advocates
Members of the German Academy of Sciences Leopoldina
Foreign associates of the National Academy of Sciences
Members of the Pontifical Academy of Sciences
Members of Academia Europaea
Commanders Crosses of the Order of Merit of the Federal Republic of Germany
Academics of the University of East Anglia
20th-century German physicists